Azizak (also Romanized as ‘Azīzak; also known as Dehestān-e ‘Azīzak) is a village in Azizak Rural District, Bahnemir District, Babolsar County, Mazandaran Province, Iran. At the 2006 census, its population was 3,860, in 1,040 families.

References 

Populated places in Babolsar County